Yu Shuang (born 29 August 2003) is a Chinese visually impaired biathlete who competed at the 2022 Winter Paralympics.

Career
Yu represented China at the 2022 Winter Paralympics and won a bronze medal in the men's 12.5 kilometres visually impaired event.

References 

Living people
2003 births
People from Dazhou
Biathletes at the 2022 Winter Paralympics
Medalists at the 2022 Winter Paralympics
Paralympic bronze medalists for China
Paralympic medalists in biathlon